Lancaster County is a county located on the Northern Neck in the Commonwealth of Virginia. As of the 2020 census, the population sits at 10,919. Its county seat is Lancaster.

Located on the Northern Neck near the mouth of the Rappahannock River, Lancaster County is part of the Northern Neck George Washington Birthplace wine-growing region recognized by the United States as an American Viticultural Area. Lancaster County is the most densely populated county in the Northern Neck. The largest town in Lancaster County is Kilmarnock, Virginia. The county's area code is 804.

History

Lancaster County was established in 1651 from Northumberland and York counties. It was home to Robert King Carter in the 18th century, and remaining buildings from that time include Christ Church and St. Mary's, Whitechapel. Other historic attractions open to the public include the Lancaster Courthouse Historic District including the Mary Ball Washington Museum and Library, Belle Isle State Park, and the Village of Morattico Historic District.

Geography

Adjacent counties
 Richmond County – northwest
 Northumberland County – north
 Middlesex County – south and southwest

Major highways

Demographics

2020 census

Note: the US Census treats Hispanic/Latino as an ethnic category. This table excludes Latinos from the racial categories and assigns them to a separate category. Hispanics/Latinos can be of any race.

2000 Census
As of the census of 2000, there were 11,567 people, 5,004 households, and 3,412 families residing in the county. The population density was 87 people per square mile (34/km2). There were 6,498 housing units at an average density of 49 per square mile (19/km2).  The racial makeup of the county was 69.95% White, 28.88% Black or African American, 0.14% Native American, 0.34% Asian, 0.06% Pacific Islander, 0.10% from other races, and 0.54% from two or more races. 0.61% of the population were Hispanic or Latino of any race.

There were 5,004 households, out of which 21.20% had children under the age of 18 living with them, 54.70% were married couples living together, 11.10% had a female householder with no husband present, and 31.80% were non-families. 28.70% of all households were made up of individuals, and 16.80% had someone living alone who was 65 years of age or older. The average household size was 2.23 and the average family size was 2.71.

In the county, the population was spread out, with 19.00% under the age of 18, 5.00% from 18 to 24, 19.60% from 25 to 44, 28.00% from 45 to 64, and 28.50% who were 65 years of age or older. The median age was 50 years. For every 100 females there were 86.80 males. For every 100 females age 18 and over, there were 81.50 males.

Type of workers for this country are: Private wage or salary (72%); Government (15%); and Self-employed (12%). The median income for a household in the county was $33,239, and the median income for a family was $42,957. Males had a median income of $30,592 versus $23,039 for females. The per capita income for the county was $24,663. Approximately 9.90% of families and 12.50% of the population were below the poverty line, including 18.00% of those under age 18 and 11.20% of those age 65 or over.

Government
Lancaster County is governed by a five-member board of supervisors. The board meets in the Lancaster County Administration Building at 7 p.m. on the last Thursday of every month. The Administration building is located at 8311 Mary Ball Road in Lancaster, Virginia.

Board of Supervisors
 District 1: Jack Larson (R)
 District 2: Ernest W. Palin, Jr. (I)
 District 3: Jason D. Bellows, Vice Chair (I)
 District 4: William R. Lee, Chair (I)
 District 5: Robert S. Westbrook, DDS (I)

Constitutional officers
 Clerk of the Circuit Court: Diane H. Mumford (I)
 Commissioner of the Revenue: Marlon Savoy
 Commonwealth Attorney: Anthony Spencer (R)
 Sheriff: Patrick McCranie (R)
 Treasurer: Bonnie J. Dickson

Lancaster is represented by Republican Ryan T. McDougle in the Virginia Senate, Republican Margaret Bevans Ransone in the Virginia House of Delegates, and Republican Robert J. "Rob" Wittman in the U.S. House of Representatives.

Communities

Towns
 Irvington
 Kilmarnock
 White Stone

Census-designated places
 Lancaster
 Weems

Other unincorporated communities

 Litwalton
 Lively
 Merry Point
 Mollusk
 Morattico
 Ottoman

Landmarks and attractions
Lancaster County is home to the historic church of St. Mary's, Whitechapel, founded in 1669. Mary Ball Washington, mother of George Washington, was born in the parish of St. Mary's. Rappahannock General Hospital is in Kilmarnock, it is the only hospital on the Northern Neck.
Other attractions are:
 Compass Entertainment Complex
 850 Christ Church Road
 King Carter Golf Course
 Golden Eagle Golf Course
 Irvington Steamboat Museum
 Indian Creek Yacht and Country Club
 The Tides Inn Resort Hotel
 White Stone Beach
 Windmill Point Beach
 Chesapeake Boat Basin Marina
 Belle Isle State Park
 Chilton Woods State Forest
 Carters Cove Marina
 Kellum Seafood Oyster House
 Rappahannock River Yacht Club
 Ampro Shipyard
 Historic Christ Church

See also
 National Register of Historic Places listings in Lancaster County, Virginia

References

 
Virginia counties
1651 establishments in Virginia
Northern Neck
Populated places established in 1651
Virginia counties on the Chesapeake Bay